Testimony of Ana is a short documentary film about a Gujarati woman who was branded a witch and attacked by villagers in a tribal area of Gujarat a few years ago. It was directed and produced by Sachin Dheeraj Mudigonda. The film has received several accolades including a National Film Awards for Best Non-Feature Film at the 68th National Film Awards. It was also qualified for the Oscars after winning the top prize at the International Documentary and Short Film Festival of Kerala (IDSFFK).

Synopsis 
The documentary recounts the story of an elderly tribal woman Anaben Pawar who was accused of witchcraft in rural India. Through this film the director Sachin has shown a deep-rooted culture of patriarchy and one of the most monstrous attacks on women's bodies in modern India.

Screening 
The film premiered at various national and international film festivals including Hot Docs Canadian International Documentary Festival, Kraków Film Festival, Festival, EnergaCAMERIMAGE International Film Festival, Imagine India International Film, International Documentary and Short Film Festival of Kerala, Indian Documentary Film Festival of Bhubaneswar, Raindance Film Festival, and Verzió International Human Rights Documentary Film Festival.

Awards and nominations

References

External links 

 

Indian short documentary films
2021 films
Gujarati-language films
2021 short documentary films